Găneasa is a commune in Olt County, Oltenia, Romania, in the vicinity of Piatra-Olt town. It is composed of five villages: Dranovățu, Găneasa, Grădiștea, Izvoru, and Oltișoru.

Natives
 Mircea Damian

References

Communes in Olt County
Localities in Oltenia